Lumin may refer to the following: 

Lumin is also used as a Chinese given name. Notable people with the name Lumin include: 
 He Lumin (born 1981), Chinese taekwondo practitioner
 Wang Lumin (born 1990), Chinese Greco-Roman wrestler
 Zhou Lumin (born 1956), Chinese volleyball player

See also 
 Luminism (disambiguation)
 Luminescence (disambiguation)
 Luminosity (disambiguation)
 Luminous (disambiguation)
 Luminal (disambiguation)
 Lumen (disambiguation)
 LuminAID, solar-rechargeable light
 Journal of Luminescence (abbreviation: J. Lumin.), monthly peer-reviewed scientific journal

Chinese given names